Elcysma is a genus of moths of the family Zygaenidae. The genus was erected by Arthur Gardiner Butler in 1881.

Selected species
 Elcysma delavayi Oberthür, 1891
 Elcysma dohertyi (Elwes, 1890) 
 Elcysma westwoodi (Snellen van Vollenhoven, 1863) – white-tailed zygaenid
 Elcysma ziroensis (Chada, Gogoi & Young, 2017) Apatani glory

References
 Koshioa, C., Murajia, M., Tatsutab, H. & Kudoa, S.-I. (2007). "Sexual selection in a moth: effect of symmetry on male mating success in the wild". Behavioral Ecology. 18 (3): 571-578. 

Chalcosiinae
Zygaenidae genera